Molinaseca is a village and municipality located in the region of El Bierzo (province of León, Castile and León, Spain) . According to the 2010 census (INE), the municipality has a population of 818 inhabitants. It is located on the French Way, the most popular path of the Camino de Santiago.

Sister cities 
  Ainan, Japan
  Águas de São Pedro, Brazil

References 

Municipalities in El Bierzo
Populated places in the Province of León